Rockin' into the Night is the third studio album by the southern rock band 38 Special, released in 1979.

With this album, 38 Special incorporated some arena rock elements into its sound.

The title track, written by three members of Survivor, became the band's first big hit (peaking at #43 during a nine-week run on the Billboard Hot 100 singles chart), and marked the first of many songs Jim Peterik would write for and with the band.

"Money Honey" is a cover of a 1953 song by Clyde McPhatter and the Drifters.

Track listing
"Rockin' into the Night" (Jim Peterik, Gary Smith, Frankie Sullivan) – 3:58
"Stone Cold Believer" (Don Barnes, Jeff Carlisi, Donnie Van Zant, Larry Junstrom) – 4:11
"Take Me Through the Night" (Barnes, Van Zant) – 4:10
"Money Honey" (Jesse Stone) – 3:10
"The Love That I've Lost" (Barnes) – 4:34
"You're the Captain" (Carlisi, Van Zant) – 4:24
"Robin Hood" (Barnes, Carlisi) – 4:40
"You Got the Deal" (Barnes, Van Zant) – 4:50
"Turn It On" (Carlisi, Van Zant) – 4:34

Personnel
Donnie Van Zant – lead vocals (2–4, 6, 9), backing vocals
Don Barnes – rhythm and lead guitar, lead vocals (1, 5, 8), backing vocals
Jeff Carlisi – lead and rhythm guitar, slide guitar
Larry Junstrom – bass
Steve Brookins – drums
Jack Grondin – drums, percussion

Additional personnel
Terry Emery – piano
Billy Powell – piano
Dale Krantz – backing vocals

Production
Producer: Rodney Mills
Engineer: Rodney Mills
Assistant engineer: Greg "Fern" Quesnel
Mastering: Bob Ludwig
Cover art concept: Chuck Beeson, Jeff Carlisi, Michael John Bowen
Photography: Chuck Beeson, Mark Hanauer

Charts
Album – Billboard (United States)

Singles – Billboard (United States)

References

38 Special (band) albums
1979 albums
A&M Records albums
Albums produced by Rodney Mills